The 1916 United States presidential election in Washington took place on November 2, 1920, as part of the 1916 United States presidential election in which all contemporary 48 states participated. Voters chose seven electors to represent them in the Electoral College via a popular vote pitting Democratic incumbents Woodrow Wilson Thomas R. Marshall, against Republican challengers Associate Justice Charles Evans Hughes and his running mate, former Vice-President Charles W. Fairbanks.

Washington had been a one-party Republican bastion for twenty years before this election. Democratic representation in the Washington legislature would during this period at times be countable on one hand, and neither Alton B. Parker nor William Jennings Bryan in his third presidential run carried even one county in the state. Republican primaries had taken over as the chief mode of political competition when introduced in the late 1900s.

However, a powerful "peace vote" in the Western states due to opposition to participation in World War I, and the transfer of a considerable part of the substantial vote for Eugene Debs from the previous election to Wilson owing to such Progressive reforms as the Sixteenth and Seventeenth Amendments allowed Woodrow Wilson to carry the Evergreen State by a 4.25 percentage point margin. In doing this, Wilson was the first ever Democratic victor in the Western Washington Puget Sound counties of Island, San Juan and Kitsap, and the only Democrat between 1904 and 1924 to carry any Washington county in a two-way presidential race.

Results

Results by county

See also
 United States presidential elections in Washington (state)

Notes

References

1916 Washington (state) elections
Washington
1916